In Greek mythology, the Androctasiae or Androktasiai (singular: Androktasia) were the female personifications of manslaughter.

Family 
The Androctasiae were the daughters of the goddess of strife and discord, Eris, and siblings to other vicious personifications like the Hysminai, the Machae, and the Phonoi. This name is also used for all of Eris' children collectively, as a whole group. 

 "And hateful Eris bore painful Ponos ("Hardship"),
 Lethe ("Forgetfulness") and Limos ("Starvation") and the tearful Algea ("Pains"),
 Hysminai ("Battles"), Makhai ("Wars"), Phonoi ("Murders"), and Androktasiai ("Manslaughters");
 Neikea ("Quarrels"), Pseudea ("Lies"), Logoi ("Stories"), Amphillogiai ("Disputes")
 Dysnomia ("Lawlessness") and Ate ("Ruin"), near one another,
 and Horkos ("Oath"), who most afflicts men on earth,
 Then willing swears a false oath."

Mythology 
In the epic poem the Shield of Heracles, attributed to Hesiod, Androktasia (singular) was one of the many figures, depicted on Heracles' shield."In his hands he (Herakles) took his shield, all glittering : no one ever broke it with a blow or crushed it. And a wonder it was to see . . . In the centre was Phobos (Fear) worked in adamant, unspeakable, staring backwards with eyes that glowed with fire. His mouth was full of teeth in a white row, fearful and daunting, and upon his grim brow hovered frightful Eris (Battle-Strife) who arrays the throng of men: pitiless she, for she took away the mind and senses of poor wretches who made war against the son of Zeus . . . Upon the shield Proioxis (Pursuit) and Palioxis (Flight) were wrought, and Homados (Tumult), and Phobos (Panic), and Androktasia (Slaughter). Eris (Battle-Strife) also, and Kydoimos (Confusion) were hurrying about, and deadly Ker (Fate) was there holding one man newly wounded. . ."

Notes

References
 Caldwell, Richard, Hesiod's Theogony, Focus Publishing/R. Pullins Company (June 1, 1987). .
 Hesiod, Shield of Heracles from The Homeric Hymns and Homerica with an English Translation by Hugh G. Evelyn-White, Cambridge, MA.,Harvard University Press; London, William Heinemann Ltd. 1914. Online version at the Perseus Digital Library. Greek text available from the same website.
Hesiod, Theogony, in The Homeric Hymns and Homerica with an English Translation by Hugh G. Evelyn-White, Cambridge, Massachusetts., Harvard University Press; London, William Heinemann Ltd. 1914. Online version at the Perseus Digital Library.
 Most, G.W., Hesiod: The Shield, Catalogue of Women, Other Fragments, Loeb Classical Library, No. 503, Cambridge, Massachusetts, Harvard University Press, 2007, 2018. . Online version at Harvard University Press.

Greek war deities
Greek goddesses
Personifications in Greek mythology
Children of Eris (mythology)
Manslaughter